Steven W. Carabatsos (born October 2, 1938) is an American screenwriter, who was also the story editor on Star Trek between the tenures of John D. F. Black and D. C. Fontana.

Early life
Steven W. Carabatsos grew up in Manhattan, where he attended Hunter College on the Upper East Side. Following his graduation, he attended Cornell Law School.

Screenwriting career
While at Cornell, he wrote a spec script for the medical drama Ben Casey. Producer Jack Laird purchased the script for use, and when he moved onto the college-based drama Channing, he hired Carabatsos to ensure that the scripts remained college oriented. Carabatsos described himself as "technical adviser in charge of rah-rah", and corresponded with his younger brother (then at college) as well as visiting colleges in the Los Angeles area in order to keep up with current trends.

Following the departure of John D. F. Black as story editor, Carabatsos was hired as his replacement in August 1966. To welcome him to the production team, the show's creator, Gene Roddenberry, decided to prank him. When Carabatsos arrived for his first day, Roddenberry had arranged for a weather balloon to be inflated inside his office, preventing him from opening the door and getting inside. The joke was only revealed after Carabatsos struggled with the door for a while.

While his contract stipulated that he would be allowed to write one episode in addition to his re-writing duties as story editor, Carabatsos found it difficult to fit his own writing around his main duties. His first job on the show was to re-write Harlan Ellison's script for "The City on the Edge of Forever" in order to bring it within budget. Ellison later accused Carabatsos of "taking a chainsaw" to the script, with multiple changes made including the addition of the Guardian of Forever and the change to initial setup wherein Doctor Leonard McCoy is overdosed with cordrazine. Roddenberry did not like Carabatsos' version, and asked Ellison to conduct a further re-write.

During the production of "Court Martial", Carabatsos was told by producer Gene L. Coon to write an entirely new script, using the same ideas and the same sets. The alternative script was later merged with the original, earning Carabatsos a co-writer credit alongside Don Mankiewicz. Carabatsos' tenure as story editor on Star Trek did not last long, and he was replaced by D. C. Fontana, but his departure left him able to write his own script as previously contracted. Carabatsos credited Roddenberry for the idea for "Operation: Destroy!", and he turned in the first version of the outline on December 15, 1966. A second draft was dated January 19, 1967, but after it was sent to the executives at NBC, they responded that they wanted to see faster pacing. The script was subsequently re-written, first by Fontana, and later by Roddenberry, becoming "Operation -- Annihilate!" in the process.

Following his departure, Carabatsos worked on several different television series as a writer and wrote the screenplays for films such as The Last Flight of Noah's Ark, a Walt Disney live-action film released in 1980, and Hot Pursuit, a 1987 film starring John Cusack.

Filmography

Films

Television

Notes

References

External links
 

1938 births
Living people
Writers from Manhattan
Cornell Law School alumni
Hunter College alumni
American science fiction writers
American television writers
American male television writers
Screenwriters from New York (state)